Anna Couani (born 6 April 1948) is a contemporary Australian poet and visual artist.

Couani was born and grew up in Sydney, the eldest of four children of medical doctors John Couani and Stefania Siedlecky. Her families have Greek and Polish heritage. She studied architecture at the University of Sydney, then took a Diploma of Education (Art) at Sydney Teachers' College and later, an MA in Teaching English as a Second Language from the University of Technology Sydney.

Since the 1970s she has participated in feminist activism and small press publishing. She was President of the Sydney branch of the Poets Union in the 1980s. She was a secondary school teacher from 1972 to 2016, teaching art and ESL. In her educational work Couani published New South Wales Department of Education and Training booklets of worksheets for ESL learners. She was union representative for The NSW Teachers Federation in several Intensive English Centres where she worked in the western suburbs of Sydney.

Couani became interested in experimental writing in the 1970s, which led to her meeting  artists and writers including Robert Kenny, Ken Bolton, Rae Jones and Kris Hemensley. Her first collection of poems, Italy, was published in 1977. She was an editor with Ken Bolton for a journal of experimental writing, Magic Sam. She established Sea Cruise Books which published books by herself, Pamela Brown, Denis Gallagher, Ken Bolton, Robert Kenny, Kerry Leves, Barbara Brooks, Moya Costello, Carmel Kelly, Kris Hemensley and Joanne Burns in the 1980s. A concern with marginalised aspects of women's lives runs throughout her writing.

In 1978 Couani was a founding member of the Sydney Women Writers Workshop, also known as the No Regrets group. In the 1980s Couani published experimental writing, including Were all Women Sex Mad?  (1982), The Train (1983), The Harbour Breathes (1989). Her novel The Western Horizon was serialised in HEAT magazine from 1996 to 2000 and is now available online. In the 2000s, she published the poetry collections Small Wonders (2011), thinking process (2017) And local (2021). Her work has appeared in many anthologies of prose and poetry.

Since 2014, she has run The Shop Gallery in Glebe with her husband, sculptor Hilik Mirankar.

Works
Prose
Italy. (Melbourne : Rigmarole, 1977)
Were all Women Sex-mad? & Other stories. (Melbourne : Rigmarole, 1982) 
Leaving Queensland & The Train. (Sydney: Sea Cruise Books 1983) 
Italy & The Train. (Melbourne: Rigmarole 1984)
The Harbour Breathes with photomontages by Peter Lyssiotis (Sydney & Melbourne: Sea Cruise/Masterthief Enterprises, 1989) 
Poetry
Small Wonders. with Chinese translation & drawings by Sou Vai Keng (Macao & Markwell: Flying Islands Books, 2011) 
thinking process. (Melbourne: Owl Publishing, 2017) 
local. with images by the author (Markwell: Flying Islands Pocket Poets, 2021) 

Edited
Island in the Sun : An anthology of recent Australian prose with Damien White & Tom Thompson (Sydney: Sea Cruise Books, 1980) 
Island in the Sun 2: An anthology of recent Australian prose with Damien White (Sydney: Sea Cruise Books, 1980) 
Minute to Midnight: New Writing for Peace and Disarmament. with Carmel Kelly, Kit Kelen & Mark Roberts (Sydney: Red Spark Books 1985) 
Telling Ways: Australian women's experimental writing with Sneja Gunew (Adelaide : Australian Feminist Studies, 1988) 
Falling Angels, (a Cordite Chapbook 2012)
To End all Wars. with Dael Allison, Kit Kelen & Les Wicks (Puncher & Wattmann 2018)

References

External links
Anna Couani
The Shop Gallery
Women Writing: Views & Prospects 1975-1995 Conference paper at NLA
Homeland, Nostalgia, the Uncanny: The Work of Anna Couani from Framing Marginality by Sneja Gunew
Anna Couani – Rochford Street Review Featured Writer Issue 14
Anna Couani's visual art
Short biography
Anna Couani's musical compositions

1948 births
Australian women poets
Living people
Artists from Sydney
Australian feminist writers
Writers from Sydney